Najibabad is a town in the Bijnor district of the Indian state of Uttar Pradesh, located near the city of Bijnor. It is a major industrial centre and has national transport links via rail and roadways such as NH 119 and NH 74.

History
Nawab Najib-ud-Daula, also known as Najib Khan, was a noted Rohilla Muslim warrior and serviceman of both the Mughal Empire and the Durrani empire in 18th century Rohilkhand. In the 1740s, he founded the town of Najibabad in Bijnor district, India, and received the title, "Nawab Najib-ud-Daulla". From 1757 to 1770 he was governor of Saharanpur, ruling over Dehradun.Many architectural relics of the period of Rohilla he oversaw remain in Najibabad, which he founded at the height of his career as a Mughal minister. He succeeded Safdarjung as Grand Wazir of the Mughal Empire and was a devoted serviceman of the Mughal Emperor Alamgir II.

According to George Foster ("A Journey from Bengal to England", 1790):

Geography
It has an average elevation of 295.5 metres (1014 feet).

Climate

People's representative
The current Member of Legislative Assembly (MLA) from Najibabad is Tasleem (Samajwadi Party). The current Municipal board(Nagar Palika) chairman is Sabiha Nishat W/O Mohammad Mozzam Khan (Samajwadi Party). Najibabad is part of Nagina parliamentary constituency and current Member of Parliament is Girish Chandra(Bahujan Samaj Party).

Forts and monuments
Najibabad has four sites protected by the Archaeological Survey of India :

Tomb of Najib-ud-Daula
Cemetery of Najib-ud-Daula
Pathargarh Fort built by Najib-ud-Daula (Famous by name of 'Sultana Daku ka Qila')
Portion of the old Rohilla Palace (called Thanna)

Other historical sites include:

 Jama Masjid Najibabad
 Eidgah Husainpur
 Purana Shiv Mandir, Adarsh Nagar, Najibabad
 Jama Masjid Husainpur
 Baba Nanhe Miya Mazar, Paibagh
 Gurudwara Najibabad
 Char minar Mehdibagh
Mordhaj also known as Munawar Jar with lofty mound Called chaar minar

Industries
Najibabad has an All India Radio centre. The town is an important trade centre for timber, sugar and grain. There are manufacturing units which deal with metal, shoes, blankets, shawls and cotton.

Handicrafts

Najibabad has many craftsmen, the most remarkable being the rafoogars or the darners.

Demographics
As of 2011 Indian census Najibabad had a total population of 88,535 of which 46,372 are males while 42,163 are females. Population within the age group of 0 – 6 years was 12,697.

Notable people
Najib ad-Dawlah
Mohammad Ali Jauhar
Akbar Shah Khan Najibabadi
Akhtar ul Iman
Sahu Jain family
Tasleem
Rais Anis Sabri - traditional singer

References

External links

 Numistatics

Cities and towns in Bijnor district
Rohilla
Embroidery in India